John Shaw Jr. (1803–1870) was an English architect of the 19th century who was complimented as a designer in the "Manner of Wren".  He designed buildings in the classical Jacobean fashion and designed some of London's first semi-detached homes in the area close to Chalk Farm. Shaw retired in the early 1860s and moved to Kensington where he died in 1870. He is buried with the Shaw and Hardwick families at Kensal Green Cemetery.

Family 
John Shaw Jr. was born in Holborn, London. His father, John Shaw Sr. (1776–1832), was  architect  to the Port of Ramsgate and Christ's Hospital school in London. Father and son did extensive work at both places while Shaw Senior trained his son; John Shaw Junior designed the lighthouse at Ramsgate.

Shaw's sister married the architect Philip Hardwick; their son Philip Charles Hardwick was also an architect. The two families lived close together in Holborn and Westminster.

Career 

Following his father's death in 1832, Shaw took on the surveyor role at Christ's Hospital, keeping an office there. He also took over work on the church of St Dunstan-in-the-West on Fleet Street in London. It was completed between 1833 and 1834. A building next-door to the church, at 187 Fleet Street, built for the Law Life Assurance Society in 1834 is a typical example of Shaw's Jacobean style. He was the designer of the Royal Naval School at New Cross (now part of Goldsmiths College).

Shaw was appointed architect to Eton College, Berkshire where he contributed the Tudor Gothic buildings.  In the same year as working for Eton (1825) Shaw developed the Chalcots estate, Chalk Farm, building semi-detached villas.

Shaw was looked upon favorably by Prince Albert as an architect who could offer something different from the usual Victorian era Gothic revival architecture. The Prince helped secure work for Shaw, including the Royal Naval School in London and Wellington College in Berkshire.

From 1844 to 1855 Shaw was one of the official referees of metropolitan buildings.

References

External links 
 John Shaw Jr Biography
 Website in memory of John Shaw Jr

1803 births
1870 deaths
19th-century English architects
People from Holborn
Burials at Kensal Green Cemetery
Architects from London